The 1927 Invercargill mayoral election was part of the New Zealand local elections held that same year. The polling was conducted using the standard first-past-the-post electoral method.

Results
The following table gives the election results:

References

1927 elections in New Zealand
Mayoral elections in Invercargill